In Greek mythology the name Andraemon  (Ancient Greek: Ἁνδραίμων Andraimōn) may refer to:

Andraemon, son of Oxylus and husband of Dryope.
Andraemon, possible father of another Oxylus.
Andraemon, an Aetolian king and husband of Gorge of Calydon. By the latter, he became the father of Thoas. Andraemon succeeded his father-in-law Oeneus' power over Aetolia. He and his wife were buried in one tomb which was shown in the city of Amphissa.
Andraemon, brother of Leonteus. He married Amphinome, a daughter of Pelias.
Andraemon, one of the Suitors of Penelope who came from Dulichium along with other 56 wooers. He, with the other suitors, was slain by Odysseus with the aid of Eumaeus, Philoetius, and Telemachus.
Andraemon, a son of King Codrus. He participated in the colonization of Asia Minor and drove the Carians out of the city of Lebedus. His tomb was shown near Colophon. Mimnermus related that Andraemon was a native of Pylos and founder of Colophon.

Similarly Andraemonides was a patronymic, frequently used to refer to Thoas, son of Andraemon and Gorge.

Notes

References 

 Antoninus Liberalis, The Metamorphoses of Antoninus Liberalis translated by Francis Celoria (Routledge 1992). Online version at the Topos Text Project.
 Apollodorus, The Library with an English Translation by Sir James George Frazer, F.B.A., F.R.S. in 2 Volumes, Cambridge, MA, Harvard University Press; London, William Heinemann Ltd. 1921. ISBN 0-674-99135-4. Online version at the Perseus Digital Library. Greek text available from the same website.
Diodorus Siculus, The Library of History translated by Charles Henry Oldfather. Twelve volumes. Loeb Classical Library. Cambridge, Massachusetts: Harvard University Press; London: William Heinemann, Ltd. 1989. Vol. 3. Books 4.59–8. Online version at Bill Thayer's Web Site
 Diodorus Siculus, Bibliotheca Historica. Vol 1-2. Immanel Bekker. Ludwig Dindorf. Friedrich Vogel. in aedibus B. G. Teubneri. Leipzig. 1888–1890. Greek text available at the Perseus Digital Library.
 Homer, The Iliad with an English Translation by A.T. Murray, Ph.D. in two volumes. Cambridge, MA., Harvard University Press; London, William Heinemann, Ltd. 1924. Online version at the Perseus Digital Library.
 Homer, Homeri Opera in five volumes. Oxford, Oxford University Press. 1920. Greek text available at the Perseus Digital Library.
 Pausanias, Description of Greece with an English Translation by W.H.S. Jones, Litt.D., and H.A. Ormerod, M.A., in 4 Volumes. Cambridge, MA, Harvard University Press; London, William Heinemann Ltd. 1918. . Online version at the Perseus Digital Library
Pausanias, Graeciae Descriptio. 3 vols. Leipzig, Teubner. 1903.  Greek text available at the Perseus Digital Library.
 Publius Ovidius Naso, Metamorphoses translated by Brookes More (1859-1942). Boston, Cornhill Publishing Co. 1922. Online version at the Perseus Digital Library.
 Publius Ovidius Naso, Metamorphoses. Hugo Magnus. Gotha (Germany). Friedr. Andr. Perthes. 1892. Latin text available at the Perseus Digital Library.
 Strabo, The Geography of Strabo. Edition by H.L. Jones. Cambridge, Mass.: Harvard University Press; London: William Heinemann, Ltd. 1924. Online version at the Perseus Digital Library.
 Strabo, Geographica edited by A. Meineke. Leipzig: Teubner. 1877. Greek text available at the Perseus Digital Library.

Suitors of Penelope
Aetolian characters in Greek mythology
Thessalian mythology